Louis Demers may refer to:

 Louis Philippe Demers (1863–1951), Canadian lawyer, professor, and politician
 Louis Julien Demers (1848–1905), merchant and political figure in Quebec